Ommatotriton or banded newts is a genus of salamanders in the family Salamandridae. The genus occurs in Western Asia and Caucasus. The species in this genus were formerly placed in the genus Triturus.

Taxonomy
The genus contains three species:
 Ommatotriton nesterovi (Litvinchuk, Zuiderwijk, Borkin, and Rosanov, 2005)
 Ommatotriton ophryticus (Berthold, 1846) — northern banded newt
 Ommatotriton vittatus (Gray, 1835) — southern banded newt

References

External links

 
Amphibian genera
Amphibians of Asia
Amphibians of Europe
Taxa named by John Edward Gray